Brian Melancon (born May 28, 1982) is a retired American mixed martial artist who most recently competed in the UFC's Welterweight division. A professional competitor from 2009-2013, Melancon also formerly competed for Strikeforce, Bellator, and Legacy FC.

Background
Born in Houston but raised in Groves, Tx. Melancon played baseball, competing at Port Neches-Groves High School. Melancon then attended Lamar University and pursued a career in physical therapy, later earning a master's degree from the University of Texas Medical Branch. At the age of 24, Melancon began training in mixed martial arts to keep himself in shape.

Mixed martial arts career

Early career
Melancon compiled a 5−1 record before signing with Strikeforce.

Strikeforce
Melancon made his promotional debut against Isaac Vallie-Flagg at Strikeforce: Overeem vs. Werdum. He lost the fight via split decision.

Melancon next faced Felipe Portela at Strikeforce Challengers: Larkin vs. Rossborough and won via unanimous decision.

Ultimate Fighting Championship
Melancon made his UFC debut by knocking out Seth Baczynski on July 6, 2013 at UFC 162 at the end of the first round.

Melancon faced Kelvin Gastelum on August 28, 2013 at UFC Fight Night 27, replacing an injured Paulo Thiago. He lost the fight via submission in the first round.

Melancon was expected to face Robert Whittaker on December 7, 2013 at UFC Fight Night 33.  However, Melancon pulled out of the bout and subsequently announced his retirement due to renal stress as a result of frequent weight cutting. Whittaker was subsequently removed from the card as well.

Mixed martial arts record

|-
| Loss
| align=center| 7–3
| Kelvin Gastelum
| Submission (rear-naked choke)
| UFC Fight Night: Condit vs. Kampmann 2
| 
| align=center| 1
| align=center| 2:26
| Indianapolis, Indiana, United States
| 
|-
| Win
| align=center| 7–2
| Seth Baczynski
| KO (punches)
| UFC 162
| 
| align=center| 1
| align=center| 4:59
| Las Vegas, Nevada, United States
| 
|-
| Win
| align=center| 6–2
| Felipe Portela
| Decision (unanimous)
| Strikeforce Challengers: Larkin vs. Rossborough
| 
| align=center| 3
| align=center| 5:00
| Las Vegas, Nevada, United States
| 
|-
| Loss
| align=center| 5–2
| Isaac Vallie-Flagg
| Decision (split)
| Strikeforce: Overeem vs. Werdum
| 
| align=center| 3
| align=center| 5:00
| Dallas, Texas, United States
|Catchweight (175 lbs) bout.
|-
| Win
| align=center| 5–1
| Derrick Krantz
| Decision (unanimous)
| Legacy FC 5
| 
| align=center| 3
| align=center| 5:00
| Houston, Texas, United States
| 
|-
| Win
| align=center| 4–1
| Todd Moore
| TKO (punches)
| Legacy FC 3
| 
| align=center| 1
| align=center| 1:00
| Houston, Texas, United States
| 
|-
| Loss
| align=center| 3–1
| Adam Schindler
| Decision (unanimous)
| Bellator 20
| 
| align=center| 3
| align=center| 5:00
| San Antonio, Texas, United States
|Catchweight (161 lbs) bout.
|-
| Win
| align=center| 3–0
| Jarrett Jones
| TKO (punches)
| Steele Cage MMA 1
| 
| align=center| 1
| align=center| n/a
| Frisco, Texas, United States
| 
|-
| Win
| align=center| 2–0
| Kenneth Battle
| Submission (punches)
| Urban Rumble Championships 4
| 
| align=center| 1
| align=center| 1:35
| Pasadena, California, United States
| 
|-
| Win
| align=center| 1–0
| Adrian Barco
| TKO (punches)
| Urban Rumble Championships 3
| 
| align=center| 1
| align=center| 1:35
| Pasadena, California, United States
|

References

External links
 
 
 

1982 births
Living people
American male mixed martial artists
Mixed martial artists from Texas
American practitioners of Brazilian jiu-jitsu
Welterweight mixed martial artists
Mixed martial artists utilizing Brazilian jiu-jitsu
People from Port Neches, Texas
Ultimate Fighting Championship male fighters